JKA England (JKAE) is the official Japan Karate Association (JKA) organisation for Shotokan karate in England and Wales. 

Japan Karate Association England (“JKAE”) is a non profit making association based in England and Wales and is associated with the Japan Karate Association (“JKA”) in Japan, one of the most prestigious, oldest and largest Shotokan Karate organisations in the world.

Under the guidance of the Chief Instructor, Sensei Yoshinobu Ohta (7th Dan), and together with the Executive and Technical Committees, they provide the administrative and practical direction to JKA England.

Every year JKAE holds spring and autumn courses, inviting instructors from the JKA honbu dojo (headquarters) to teach.

History
JKAE was officially formed in 2003 with Sensei Yoshinobu Ohta as Chief instructor. Following the death of Keinosuke Enoeda (Sensei Ohta was Master Enoeda’s assistant from 1983 to 2003), the KUGB withdrew from the JKA with Andy Sherry as their chief instructor.  The division had a strong geographic correlation: most northern clubs chose KUGB and most southern clubs chose JKAE.

Instructors

The JKAE Chief instructor is Yoshinobu Ohta, ranked at 7th Dan. He is a graduate of Takushoku University and attended the JKA instructors' classes at the JKA honbu dojo in Tokyo. Ohta was the assistant of Enoeda for 20 years since 1982.

Technical committee members are Gary Stewart, 6th Dan; Adel Ismail, 6th Dan; and Giuseppe D’Onofrio, 6th Dan.

Competition
JKAE hosts two tournaments every year. The JKAE National Championships and the JKAE Open Championships. In 2022 the Open Championships had more than 400 competitors from 8 countries. From 2004 to 2008 this was held at Guildford Spectrum sports centre. From 2009 this has been held at the K2 Crawley sports centre.

The kumite competition ruleset used is shobu ippon (one point match).

International course history

References

2003 establishments in the United Kingdom
Karate organizations
Shotokan
Sports organisations in London
Karate in the United Kingdom